Hohentengen is a municipality in the district of Sigmaringen in Baden-Württemberg in Germany.

References

Sigmaringen (district)
Württemberg